Guide Bridge is an area west of Ashton-under-Lyne, in Tameside, Greater Manchester, England. Historically part of Lancashire, Guide Bridge was built as a village around an eponymous bridge over the Ashton Canal.

History

Industries included Scott & Hodgson Ltd which had an engine shop near Guide Bridge railway station. In later years it was occupied by "Arnfields", makers of Mono-Pumps. Guide Bridge is located on the Ashton Canal, and later on the Sheffield, Ashton-Under-Lyne and Manchester Railway. These were used for the transportation of raw materials and the delivery of parts of the finished engines.
Guide Bridge was the home of the Jones Sewing Machine Company.

Governance
Since the Reform Act 1832, Guide Bridge has been represented in the House of Commons of the United Kingdom as part of the Ashton-under-Lyne parliamentary constituency. The constituency was initially represented in the House of Commons by members of the Liberal Party until a period of Conservative Party dominance in the late 19th century. Since 1935, the constituency has been under Labour Party control. The member of parliament since 2015 has been Angela Rayner.

The Conservative Party, which has enjoyed a steady rise in the constituency since 2001, while still being outstripped by the Labour Party which has seen an even bigger rise in votes in the constituency since 2010, is represented in Guide Bridge by the Guide Bridge Conservative Club.

Community
It is served by Guide Bridge railway station which also serves as a railway junction.

At the centre of Guide Bridge is St. Stephen's Church and St Stephen's Church of England Primary School.

Guide Bridge is home to the Guide Bridge Theatre, formerly the Ashton and Audenshaw Repertory Club, which opened on 29 July 1972.

References

External links

 Guide Bridge Theatre

Areas of Greater Manchester
Geography of Tameside
Audenshaw